The Index is a  tall, 80-storey skyscraper in Dubai, United Arab Emirates. Of the 80 floors, the first four floors are service floors, 5th–29th are to be offices and 31st–77th are residential use, 73rd and 75th floors are duplex penthouses and 77th to 80th floor are triplex penthouses. The tower is oriented exactly along the east–west axis so that the eastern and western concrete cores shelter the floors from the harsh, desert sun and the climatic effects of the area. The concrete cores shelter the building from the low angle, highly penetrating morning and evening sun leaving only the south facade exposed to the high angle, low penetrating midday sun. The south-facing facade utilizes extensive sun shades to lower solar gain.

The Index is one of the first towers in the region to intelligently embrace its climatic surrounding environment within its fundamental design principles. The tower's environmental strategy significantly lowers the requirement for air conditioning within the building and therefore substantially reduces the energy costs for its tenants. During the height of the summer, without air conditioning, the tower's internal temperatures will not surpass 28 degrees Celsius.

The tower has car parking for 2,442 cars. A double height sky lobby separates the offices and apartments with recreational facilities, such as a swimming pool and a gym.

In June 2011, The Index Tower was the recipient of the 2011 Best Tall Building Middle East & Africa award by the Council on Tall Buildings and Urban Habitat.

As of December 2015, the full retail space, two-thirds of the office floors and 1404 parking spaces were owned by Emirates REIT, UAE's first Real Estate Investment Trust.

See also
List of tallest buildings in Dubai
List of tallest buildings in the United Arab Emirates
List of tallest buildings in the world

References

External links

 The Index UP.AE
 The Index on CTBUH Skyscraper Center
 Union Properties: The Index
 Foster + Partners - Projects - The Index
 Index Tower Image gallery

Residential skyscrapers in Dubai
Office buildings completed in 2010
Residential buildings completed in 2010
Foster and Partners buildings
Skyscraper office buildings in Dubai